Tuen Mun is an MTR Light Rail stop which belongs to zone 2. There are two platforms in Tuen Mun stop. This Light Rail stop is located above Pui To Road and Ho Pong Street and north of Tuen Mun Park. It provides service for nearby residents and is an interchange station for the Tuen Ma line, formerly known as West Rail line.

History
On 18 September 1988, San Fat stop opened below the site of the current Tuen Mun stop, at ground level. It was named after the San Fat Estate. On 1 August 2003, San Fat stop was renamed Tuen Mun stop (in preparation for the opening of the West Rail line Tuen Mun station later that year). At that time, the at-grade platforms were still used. On 30 August the same year, the elevated platforms officially commenced service, although some Light Rail vehicles had been using the westbound platform from one week before.

Station layout

References

External links

MTR Tuen Mun Station location map

MTR Light Rail stops
Tuen Mun District
Railway stations in Hong Kong opened in 1988

ja:屯門駅